Breviceps branchi or Branch's rain frog is a species of frogs endemic to South Africa in the Breviceps genus of frogs.

References

branchi
Frogs of Africa
Amphibians of South Africa
Amphibians described in 2012